Norman D. Wilson (4 October 1938 – 9 December 2004) was an American actor. He appeared in Lethal Weapon 3 (1992), Always Outnumbered (1998) and The Stone Killer (1973). He died on December 9, 2004, in Los Angeles.

Filmography

References

External links 
 

1938 births
2004 deaths
American male film actors
Male actors from Louisiana
20th-century American male actors